Hengshan Station may refer to the following stations:
Hengshan metro station, a station on the Taoyuan Airport MRT
Hengshan railway station, a station on the TRA Neiwan line